Pterolophia kubokii is a species of beetle in the family Cerambycidae. It was described by Masao Hayashi in 1976.

References

kubokii
Beetles described in 1976